Kurubana Rani is a 1998 Indian Kannada-language film directed, written and scripted by D. Rajendra Babu, starring Shiva Rajkumar, Nagma and Hema Choudhary, Lokesh. The film was produced by Rockline Venkatesh under his home production, Rockline Studios.

Cast
 Shiva Rajkumar as Kencha
 Nagma as Rani
 Hema Choudhary
 Lokesh
 Mukhyamantri Chandru
 C. R. Simha
 Sumithra (actress)
 Sihi Kahi Chandru
 Lakshman (actor)
 Bank Janardhan
 Mandeep Roy

Soundtrack
The music of the film was composed by V. Manohar. Actor Rajkumar recorded a song "Thaali Thaali", which was well received.

References

1998 films
1990s Kannada-language films
Indian romance films
Films scored by V. Manohar
Rockline Entertainments films
Films directed by D. Rajendra Babu
1990s romance films